St James College is an independent Catholic secondary day school for boys and girls, located in Brisbane, Queensland, Australia. St James College, informally known as Jimmies, was established in 1868 with only 12 students and is the oldest Catholic boys' school in Queensland. In 1893, the Congregation of Christian Brothers agreed to take over the school following major economic depression, the government's refusal to pay staff wages and inconsistent student enrolment. , the co-educational school had an enrolment of approximately 520 students from Year 7 to Year 12. The school principal is Anne Rebgetz.

History 
Jerome William Long (1834–1891) was the first lay Principal to lead St James between 1871 and 1877, and again in 1880–90, he is accredited with being the first teacher to hold a Class 2, Division 1 certificate in Queensland. Long was honoured by the college, which named Long House after him.

In 1994, the college began to accept enrolment from girls in years 8 and 11, making it a co-educational institution. In 1994, its name was changed to St. James Prac.; it was then reverted to St. James College in 2001. In 2002, its first female principal was appointed. The college has also been known as Edmund Rice College, St James's, and St James Practical College. The college constructed a new library and science complex, named the Joseph Canali Centre completed in 2015 when the college began accepting enrolments for grade 7. In 2013 enrolment stood at approximately 480 students.

Principals 

The following individuals have served as principals or headmasters of St James' College:

House system
There are four houses at St James College, Carey, Hogan, Long and Mary Rice. With the exception of Mary Rice, all were the original houses of St James; Mary Rice was added in recent years.

Current houses
 Carey House is named after Tom Carey, an old boy of the college. (House colour: blue)
 Hogan House is named after Br Hogan, the first Christian Brother principal of the college. (House colour: gold)
 Long House is named after Jerome William Long, the first lay principal. (House colour: white)
 Mary Rice House is named after Mary Rice, the daughter of Edmund Rice, the founder of the Christian Brothers. (House colour: maroon)

Sports 
St James College offers a  basketball program that is fully inclusive to all levels of ability for both boys and girls. The Jimmies Basketball Program is accessible to all students regardless of their financial circumstances and focuses on development of the individual. In October 2013, St James College won the 2013 Queensland State Basketball Championship and was crowned the "Best Basketball School in Queensland". The team will now travel to Melbourne in December to represent Queensland in the Australian Schools Basketball Championship.

Notable alumni 

 Rodney Eyles – former World No 1 in squash
 Graham Quirk – politician, offices include former Lord Mayor of Brisbane
Reginald John Mickel  Speaker of the Legislative Assembly of Queensland
Former Minister 
Minister for Transport, Trade, Employment and Industrial Relations of Queensland

Minister for State Development, Industrial Relations, and Employment of Queensland

Minister for Aboriginal and Torres Strait Islanders Policy of Queensland

Minister for Energy of Queensland

Minister for Environment of Queensland

Member of the Queensland Parliament
for Logan
In office
13 June 1998 – 24 March 2012

James Robert Martin is an Australian politician who currently serves as the Labor member for Stretton in the Queensland Legislative Assembly, having been elected at the 2021 Stretton state by-election on 24 July 2021

Robert Vincent Anderson OAM (born 31 July 1929) is an Australian Aboriginal elder and former union official.[1]

Anderson, often referred to as Uncle Bob, is known for his long association with the Building Workers' Industrial Union of Australia where he was state organiser from 1951 to 1978.[2] He is also an honorary member of the Construction, Forestry, Mining and Energy Union.[2]

As a Ngugi elder from Mulgumpin in Quandamooka, Anderson has also served in various roles with an array of indigenous organisations, working in the fields of reconciliation, native title, social justice, youth welfare and cultural identity.[3]

In the 1960s, Anderson was a member of the Queensland Council for Advancement for Aborigines and Torres Strait Islanders.[4] In 1999, he was appointed chair of the Aboriginal and Torres Strait Islander Advisory Board, a role he retired from in 2003

See also 

 Catholic education in Australia
 List of schools in Queensland
 List of Christian Brothers schools

References

External links
 
 Brisbane Catholic Education Directory Page
 Jimmes, Where are they Now?

Catholic secondary schools in Brisbane
Educational institutions established in 1868
1868 establishments in Australia
Congregation of Christian Brothers secondary schools in Australia
Spring Hill, Queensland